Dyschirius angustatus is a species of ground beetle in the subfamily Scaritinae. It was described by Ahrens in 1830.

References

angustatus
Beetles described in 1830